Cadbury, Somerset may refer to:

North Cadbury
South Cadbury
Cadbury Castle, Somerset